Salawas is a small village 22 km from Jodhpur and is famous for durries (rugs) made by the local craftsmen. 

Rajasthan's largest, and Jodhpur's only, Paintball field is located on the boundary between Salawas and the adjoining village of Nandwan. 

Dhani and villages
Durries

Villages in Jodhpur district